The European army or EU army are terms for a hypothetical army of the European Union which would supersede the Common Security and Defence Policy and would go beyond the proposed European Defence Union.  Currently, there is no such army, and defence is a matter for the member states.

Background
The idea of a European army was first discussed in 1950. It was proposed by France and would have consisted of the "Inner Six" countries (Belgium, France, Italy, Luxembourg, the Netherlands, and West Germany), in order to strengthen defence against the Soviet threat without directly rearming Germany in the wake of World War II. In 1952 the Treaty establishing the European Defence Community was signed but not ratified by the signatories.

However, during the Cold War, Western Europe relied on NATO for defence, precluding the development of European cooperation. Immediately after the "fall of communism", the defence apparatus was preoccupied by NATO expansion into the former Soviet bloc. The idea of a European army gained popularity after the September 11 attacks and NATO's involvement in conflicts outside of Europe. In a phenomenon dubbed diversification of European security, NATO has come to be responsible for "hard" threats while the European Union has taken a greater role in "soft" threats, including peacekeeping in the western Balkans. The 2009 Treaty of Lisbon also has furthered defence integration within the EU. This has led to support for a European Defence Union, which would be a step higher in collaboration than the current Common Security and Defence Policy.

In 2019, Germany and the Netherlands activated 414 Tank Battalion, the first that included soldiers from two EU countries. The battalion was created because Germany did not have enough soldiers, while the Netherlands lacked tank capability. This was described as a step towards a European army. The Franco-German Brigade in Alsace has been less successful due to greater linguistic and cultural differences.

Under the current arrangement, there is no EU army and defence is reserved for the member states.

Characteristics
The term "European army" is vague and it is not entirely clear what it would entail. Increasing integration would make security more efficient and less expensive for member states.

Support and opposition

Support
French president Emmanuel Macron and former German Chancellor Angela Merkel have both expressed their support for a joint European army. Macron endorsed the idea in 2018, after the United States withdrew from the Intermediate-Range Nuclear Forces Treaty and in light of American President Donald Trump's scepticism of Atlanticism. Other European politicians who have expressed support include former French prime minister Alain Juppé (in 1996), former Italian prime minister Silvio Berlusconi, European Commission President Jean-Claude Juncker, former Czech prime ministers Miloš Zeman and Bohuslav Sobotka, and Hungarian Prime Minister Viktor Orbán. A European army is on the official programme of the European People’s Party.

Dutch deputy prime minister Kajsa Ollongren supports the idea while defence minister Ank Bijleveld opposes it. It is also opposed by Eurosceptic politicians in the EU, such as Ryszard Legutko. NATO has been described as the "biggest obstacle" to a European army. 

A 2019 survey found that 37% of Dutch citizens "approved the idea of a European army" while 30% are opposed to formation of an army of all EU members.

In 2021, The President of the Italian Republic Sergio Mattarella spoke about the need to create a European army, after the withdrawal of NATO forces from Afghanistan ended the War in Afghanistan allowing the takeover by the Taliban.
Former Italian Prime Minister Silvio Berlusconi also spoke in favour of the creation of the European army to protect Europe's borders.
The Italian Army General, Claudio Graziano, Chairman of the European Union Military Committee, also expressed the need to set up a European army as soon as possible.

At the 2021 State of the Union address delivered by the President of the European Commission to the European Parliament, Ursula von der Leyen said to European Union members that "what we need is the European Defence Union" and that "...the European Union is a unique security provider. There will be missions where NATO or the UN will not be present but where Europe should be... There have been many discussions on expeditionary forces. On what type and how many we need: battlegroups or EU entry forces. This is no doubt part of the debate – and I believe it will be part of the solution. But the more fundamental issue is why this has not worked in the past." and announced a 'Summit on European defence'

On 17 September 2021, the Italian Prime Minister, Mario Draghi talked about the European army at the end of the EuMed summit in Athens, with an urgent tone for its establishment.

The announcement of the AUKUS "trilateral security partnership" between Australia, UK and US to "sustain peace and stability in the Indo-Pacific region" is seen as an attempt to limit China's rise as a global military power. However, this has led to some mistrust in Europe, in particular in France, that has contributed to increasing the process of the formation of a European Army.

On 28 September 2021, Greece and France signed a multibillion-euro military agreement. The Greek prime minister Kyriakos Mitsotakis called the idea of a European army “a mature proposal” and that this agreement could be a first big step towards a European army.

Opposition

According to NATO officials, the alliance has discouraged independent European defence capabilities, both as an attempt to avoid duplication and as a moral hazard effect from US defence subsidies prompting less military spending by European countries. The United States ambassador to NATO also expressed opposition to any European protectionism in developing its own defence industry. NATO Secretary-General Jens Stoltenberg said that the European Union could not defend itself without NATO and should not try to form a European army.

On the occasion of the 70th anniversary of NATO's presence in Italy, Mattarella spoke of a strengthening of European defense within  the alliance with NATO.

See also
Permanent Structured Cooperation
European Defence Agency
EU Battlegroup
414 Tank Battalion

References

External links 

 An integrated European regiment: A proposed evolution in the Eurocorps and ESDI in NATO

Military of the European Union
Proposals in Europe
Public policy proposals